La Baule-Escoublac, commonly referred to as La Baule, is a commune in the Loire-Atlantique department, Pays de la Loire, western France.

A century-old seaside resort in southern Brittany with villas, casino, luxury hotels and an original mix of old Breton and seaside culture with a 9 kilometre long sand beach, La Baule has long been home to French high society's seaside residences. During July and August each year, the population of La Baule increases dramatically with many Parisians staying for weeks and regular day-trippers from Nantes. Parisians can take the train in Paris Montparnasse Station and it is about 3 hours to go to La Baule. Despite this, La Baule is still virtually unknown outside France.

History
In 1779, a violent storm buried the village of Escoublac, near the current location of La Baule, under sand. Escoublac was rebuilt further inland. At that time, the very unstable dunes were occupied only by customs officers, who gave them the name of Bôle, a term indicating an easily flooded maritime meadow.

Birth of a seaside resort
It was only in 1879, when the Saint-Nazaire-Croisic railroad was conceived by Parisian industrialist Jules-Joseph Hennecart that the tourist potential of the coast was recognised.

Just before the inauguration of the line, Hennecart bought 40 ha of dunes for the Society of Escoublac Dunes (Société des dunes d'Escoublac) and commissioned local architect Georges Lafont to design the new town. Lafont designed a long sand promenade named Avenue de la Gare (today Avenue du Général-de-Gaulle) and a chapel (see picture). After the railroad opened Lafont built more than 250 villas, taking the lead in the development of the seaside resort.

Rise of a seaside resort
In 1918, casino business magnate François André (see Groupe Lucien Barrière) set up the redesigning of the La Baule resort based on the Deauville model by combining casinos, luxury hotels and sports facilities all on one site.

In the 1920s, Parisian businessman Louis Lajarrige designed the Bois d'Amour district at La Baule-les-Pins and formed an agreement with the railroad company to move the rails away from the seaside to ensure a direct access to the beach. On July 27, 1927 the new stations of La Baule-les-Pins and La Baule-Escoublac were inaugurated while the old station was torn down to create a flower garden square. By that time, La Baule had become a fashionable seaside resort.

Poche de Saint-Nazaire
During World War II, La Baule formed part of the protective stretch of coast leading to the nearby harbour city of Saint-Nazaire, home of one of the biggest U-Boat stations that the Germans built. It not only serviced the German submarine fleet, but was also the only dry dock on the Atlantic capable of housing the German battleship Tirpitz, one of two Bismarck-class ships built for the German Kriegsmarine during World War II.

La Baule and the surrounding areas were heavily occupied by the Germans throughout World War II. During the occupation, a large number of Jewish residents and resistance members were deported to the concentration camps; in La Baule itself 32 Jewish men, women and children - the youngest of whom was 3 years old -  were deported (with the assistance of the local French police) to Auschwitz where they all perished.

In 2011, a small group of local residents formed a group to create a permanent memorial, in the form of Stolperstein, to the 32 Jewish deportees since, although there was a memorial in La Baule to 40 named war victims, there was no mention there or on any other memorial of the 32 Jewish deportees. The Mayor refused to allow a request for the Stolpersteines to be installed, claiming that to do so might infringe the French constitutional principles of secularism ("laïcité") and freedom of opinion ("liberté d'opinion") and that the Mairie would therefore need to consult the Conseil d'État, France's constitutional court. In fact, Stolpersteines contain no reference to the religion of the victim who is commemorated and 'freedom of opinion/expression' has never been invoked in either French or European jurisprudence to justify the refusal to commemorate individual victims of war crimes. The Mayor of La Baule has consistently refused to elaborate on his reasoning, and there is no record of the Municipal Council of La Baule having sought a declaration from the Conseil d'Etat in respect of these objections.

Such was the importance attached to the area by the Germans that their troops kept fighting in La Baule and Saint-Nazaire for nine months longer than in the rest of the department, eventually surrendering on May 11, 1945, (3 days after the German unconditional surrender), making this one of the last liberated parts of France. This episode is called Poche de Saint-Nazaire from the French expression poche de resistance.

Population

Tourism
One of France's most exclusive seaside resorts during the first half of the 20th century, La Baule has become much more democratized since the 1960s. Today the resort mixes wealthy family villas, luxury hotels and seaside apartment buildings. The nearby region has long been an area of contact and conflict between Breton culture and that of the neighbouring Loire Valley, and consequently is rich with historic places, castles (Nantes castle), walled cities (Guerande), not to mention 19th century seaside resorts, such as Quiberon, and many typical Breton fishing villages (Le Croisic, Pornichet).

Culture

Grand Prix de la Baule (automobiles)
The Grand Prix de la Baule was a Grand Prix motor racing event held there during the 1930s.

Grand Prix de la Baule (equestrian)
Today, the Grand Prix de la Ville de La Baule is an equestrian jumping competition part of the international Equestrian Nations Cup series.

Tourism
Local tourist authorities routinely refer to the bay as "the most beautiful in Europe". La Baule is part of the Côte d'Amour.

The commune of Escoublac has achieved a new vitality with the restoration of its civic center and the installation of many attractions.

The Musee Aeronautique Presqu'ile Cote d'Amour (MAPICA), located at the airport, maintains a collection of restored historical French aircraft in flying condition.

Personalities linked to the commune 
 Lluís Companys i Jover (1882-1940)
 William Grover-Williams (1903-1945)
 Henri Anger (1907–1989), novelist
 Gérard Lecointe (1912-2009)
 Olivier Guichard (1920–2004)
 Lucien Barrière (1923-1991)
 Édouard Luntz
 Dominique Desseigne (1944)
 Marc Pajot, (1953)
 Bruno Peyron, (1955)
 Lolo Ferrari (1963-2000)
 Charlotte Di Calypso

International relations

La Baule-Escoublac is twinned with:
 Nowy Sącz in Poland
 Inverness, Scotland
 Homburg, Saarland, Germany, since 1984
 Corfu, Greece

See also
Communes of the Loire-Atlantique department
La Baule – Guérande Peninsula
Parc naturel régional de Brière

References

External links

 News, Events Tourism... - RSS
 La Baule and the Love Coast (in English)
 Official La Baule Tourist Office (in English)
 City council website (in French)
 Many pictures of La Baule
  Directory La Baule
 The website to party at La Baule

Communes of Loire-Atlantique
Seaside resorts in France